William Park Kennedy (October 7, 1867 – September 23, 1915), nicknamed "Brickyard" and "Roaring Bill", was an American pitcher in Major League Baseball from 1892 to 1903. He played for the Brooklyn Grooms/Bridegrooms/Superbas (1892–1901), New York Giants (1902), and Pittsburgh Pirates (1903).

Baseball career
Kennedy was born in Bellaire, Ohio, in 1867. From 1889 to 1891, he played minor league baseball. Kennedy then joined Brooklyn of the National League. He won over 10 games for Brooklyn every year from 1892 to 1900. He had four 20-win seasons, including a career-high 25 in 1893.

In 1901, Kennedy won three games. He was then released by Brooklyn and signed with New York, winning one game with them.

Kennedy signed with Pittsburgh for the 1903 season and won nine games for the team, which won the National League championship. He started one game in the 1903 World Series and lost. It was his last major league game.

From 1904 to 1908, Kennedy played in the Central League.

Legacy
During his 12-year major league career, Kennedy had a 187–159 win–loss record with a 3.96 earned run average and 799 strikeouts in 3,030 innings pitched. He had the fourth-most wins of the 1890s, behind Kid Nichols, Cy Young, and Amos Rusie.

Kennedy was a better than average hitting pitcher in his major league career. He posted a .261 batting average (334-for-1279) with 1 home run and 148 RBI along with 54 doubles and 21 triples.

Kennedy was nicknamed "Brickyard". He was also commonly known as "Roaring Bill" because he had a loud voice and talked a lot.

Kennedy died in Bellaire, Ohio, in 1915, at the age of 47.

References

External links

Brickyard Kennedy - Baseballbiography.com

1867 births
1915 deaths
19th-century baseball players
Major League Baseball pitchers
Brooklyn Grooms players
Brooklyn Bridegrooms players
Brooklyn Superbas players
New York Giants (NL) players
Pittsburgh Pirates players
Wheeling National Citys players
Wheeling Nailers (baseball) players
Denver Grizzlies (baseball) players
Denver Mountaineers players
Wheeling Stogies players
Dayton Veterans players
Baseball players from Ohio
People from Bellaire, Ohio
20th-century deaths from tuberculosis
Tuberculosis deaths in Ohio